Robert "Bob" W. Craddock (September 5, 1923 – March 28, 2003) was an American soccer player who was a member of the U.S. team at the 1950 FIFA World Cup. He earned one cap in 1954.

Club career
Craddock spent his playing career in Pennsylvania with two teams, Castle Shannon and Harmarville. He was with Harmarville when selected for the 1950 FIFA World Cup. Harmarville lost both the 1950 and 1952 National Amateur Cup and the 1954 and 1956 National Challenge Cups.

National team
While Craddock was selected to the U.S. roster for the 1950 FIFA World Cup, he earned his only cap with the national team in a 3-0 win over Haiti on April 4, 1954.

Craddock was inducted into the National Soccer Hall of Fame in 1997. His father Robert B. Craddock is also a member of the Hall of Fame.

References

External links
 National Soccer Hall of Fame profile

1923 births
2003 deaths
American soccer players
American people of Welsh descent
Castle Shannon SC players
Harmarville Hurricanes players
National Soccer Hall of Fame members
Soccer players from Pittsburgh
United States men's international soccer players
1950 FIFA World Cup players
Association football forwards